Poison Ivy is a 1992 American erotic thriller film directed by Katt Shea. It stars Drew Barrymore, Sara Gilbert, Tom Skerritt and Cheryl Ladd. The original music score is composed by David Michael Frank. The film was shot in Los Angeles.

It was nominated for the 1992 Grand Jury prize of Best Film at the Sundance Festival. Sara Gilbert was nominated for Best Supporting Female at the 1993 Independent Spirit Awards. Although it did not fare very well at the box office, grossing $1,829,804 with its limited theatrical release to 20 movie theaters, the film received favorable word-of-mouth, and became a success on cable and video in the mid-1990s. It is the first installment in a Poison Ivy film series that includes three direct-to-video sequels.

Plot
Sylvie Cooper is a young girl at a private school for the wealthy. At a local hangout, she first meets Ivy, a street-smart but poor girl, and witnesses Ivy mercy-killing a heavily wounded dog.

In their second meeting, when Sylvie's father Darryl comes to pick her up, Ivy asks for a ride, and Darryl reluctantly agrees. Ivy makes an excuse to sit in the front with Darryl. She puts her feet on the dashboard and deliberately allows her mini-skirt to fall back onto her hip, revealing her legs, which Darryl notices.

A few weeks later, Sylvie invites Ivy to her house. She tells Ivy that Darryl is her adoptive father and that her biological father is African-American. She also says that she once tried to kill herself. They meet Sylvie's sickly mother, Georgie, whom Ivy later wins over by talking about her scholarship and helping her unblock her oxygen tank.

Soon after, as both of Sylvie's parents enjoy Ivy's company, they practically allow Ivy to move in. Ivy and Sylvie share clothes and sleep in the same bed. As they have similar figures, Georgie lends Ivy some of her clothes.

In an attempt to improve his failing career, Darryl decides to throw a party at his house, and enlists Sylvie to help him. However, Sylvie is needed at work on the night of the party, which is orchestrated by Ivy so that she will be the one to assist Darryl. After the party, she dances with Darryl in the kitchen and they hug. Georgie walks in on them and storms upstairs. Ivy apologizes to Georgie and claims that Darryl was under stress and she was only comforting him. Georgie believes Ivy, accepts a glass of champagne drugged with sleeping pills, and falls asleep. Ivy sits on the bed next to Georgie and begins to massage Darryl with her foot while he kisses her legs.

Over the next few days, Ivy continues changing her appearance and wears Georgie's clothing more often. Sylvie becomes increasingly irritated with Ivy for her growing presence in her family, and her anger reaches a breaking point when even her dog chooses Ivy over her, which in fact is because Ivy has some dog treats in her pockets. Sylvie skips school and tries to spend some time alone. Darryl picks Ivy up and they go into the forest, where she gets him drunk and has sex with him.

The next morning, Georgie plays a cassette tape that Sylvie made for her and walks out onto her balcony. Ivy walks up behind Georgie, talks to her and without warning, pushes her off the balcony to her death. Because Georgie is known to have a mental illness, and has threatened to commit suicide previously, Ivy is not suspected. A few weeks later, Sylvie talks Ivy into going for a ride in her mother's sports car. When Sylvie becomes suspicious of her involvement in Georgie's death, Ivy crashes the car, then moves the unconscious Sylvie into the driver's seat.

In the hospital, Sylvie hallucinates that her mother is sitting in front of her. This inspires her to get back to her house in an attempt to save her father from Ivy. When she gets to her house, there is a raging storm. She runs inside to get out of the rain, experiencing hallucinations all along the way. When she gets inside, she sees Darryl and Ivy having sex, and flees the room.

As Darryl runs outside to look for Sylvie, Ivy runs out after him, accidentally revealing that she was behind the wheel; due to scarring on her chest. She lies, claiming that it was to protect him. He drives off to find Sylvie and Ivy goes up to Georgie's old room, plays the tape Sylvie made for Georgie, wears Georgie's robe and walks out to the balcony. Sylvie sees Ivy and, because of her head injury, believes that it is her mother and makes her way to the balcony. Sylvie tells Georgie that she loves her and Georgie says she loves Sylvie too. When they kiss, Ivy begins to use her tongue, which breaks Sylvie out of her hallucination. Ivy says Georgie wanted to die and now the three of them can be a family. Sylvie rejects her delusion and pushes Ivy over the balcony, but Ivy holds onto Sylvie's necklace in an attempt to take Sylvie with her. Her attempt backfires, as the chain breaks, and a screaming Ivy falls to her death alone. Darryl returns to see Ivy's corpse on the ground with Sylvie above.

The film ends with Sylvie narrating that she still loves and misses "her", following the parallel between Ivy and Georgie.

Cast

Production
Producers Melissa Goddard and Peter Morgan brought the original idea to New Line. The studio then hired Katt Shea who had made a number of movies for Roger Corman; according to head of production Sara Risher, the studio wanted "a teenage Fatal Attraction".

The film developed greatly from this premise. There were three different drafts of the script and four different endings. According to Shea, the original ending had Ivy getting away with her crimes and hitch-hiking along a road. However, New Line insisted that Ivy be punished and made her shoot a new ending where Ivy died. New Line then wanted Shea to revive the character for sequels which the director refused to do; Shea now says she regrets the decision.

Shea says that she never regarded Ivy as villainous, but rather as a tragic character who just wants to be loved. She credits this for the film's popularity.

Reception

Critical response
The film debuted at the Sundance Film Festival where, according to The New York Times, viewers were "either enraptured or insulted". At the Seattle International Festival of Women Directors it was perceived to be politically incorrect. Shea stated:
I always told New Line it was going to be different from what they thought. I'm out to prove it's possible to make a film that's really artistic, that's an honest expression that comes from me and that can still be commercial. I told them I can only make movies for myself. I just know that if I really love it there's going to be a market for it.

On Rotten Tomatoes it has an approval rating of 41% rating based on 32 reviews. The site's critics consensus reads, "An unpleasant thriller that lacks the self-awareness to dilute its sordid undertones, Poison Ivy is liable to give audiences a rash." On Metacritic it has a score of 51 out of 100 based on reviews from 24 critics, indicating "mixed or average reviews".

Variety wrote: "Suicide, hints of lesbianism, murder, staged accidents and every other applicable melodramatic contrivance is dragged in. Unfortunate thesps take it all very seriously, while technical aspects are emptily polished."
Roger Ebert of the Chicago Sun-Times gave it 2.5 out of 4 and wrote "Here the casting is so wrong that nothing quite works."

The character Ivy was ranked at number six on the list of the top 26 "bad girls" of all time by Entertainment Weekly.

Sequels

Poison Ivy spawned three sequels: Poison Ivy II: Lily in 1996, Poison Ivy: The New Seduction in 1997 and Poison Ivy: The Secret Society in 2008.

References

External links
 
 
 
 
 

1992 films
1992 drama films
1992 independent films
1992 thriller films
1990s American films
1990s English-language films
1990s erotic drama films
1990s erotic thriller films
1990s teen drama films
1990s thriller drama films
American erotic drama films
American erotic thriller films
American independent films
American neo-noir films
American teen drama films
American thriller drama films
Films about adultery in the United States
Films directed by Katt Shea
Films scored by David Michael Frank
Films set in Los Angeles
Films shot in Los Angeles
Juvenile sexuality in films
Teen thriller films